Thomas Clark may refer to:

Authors and academicians
Thomas D. Clark (1903–2005), Kentucky historian
Thomas Arkle Clark (1862–1932), American academic
Thomas Clark (writer) (born 1980), Scottish writer
Thomas Fife Clark (1907–1985), British journalist and civil servant

Business, commerce, and public service
Thomas Clark (Upper Canada) (died 1835), Canadian businessman and political figure
Sir Thomas Clark, 1st Baronet (1823–1900), Lord Provost of Edinburgh 1865–1888
Thomas Clark (Long Beach) (born 1926), mayor of Long Beach, California, 1975–1980, and 1982–1984
Thomas Alonzo Clark (1920–2005), U.S. federal judge
Tom C. Clark (1899–1977), U.S. Attorney General and Associate Supreme Court justice

Performing arts, and fine arts
 Thomas Clark (composer) (1775–1859), composer of West Gallery music
 Thomas Brown Clark (1895–1983), Scottish painter
 Thomas Clark (actor), English stage actor

Scientific disciplines and inventors
T. H. Clark (1893–1996), American/Canadian geologist
Thomas Clark (chemist) (1801–1867), British chemist
Thomas J. Clark (1869–1907), American inventor

Sports
Thomas Clark (cricketer), eighteenth-century cricketer
Thomas Clark (rower) (1906–1990), American Olympic rower

Other people
Thomas M. Clark (1812–1903), American Episcopal presiding bishop
Thomas Clark (North Carolina soldier) (1741–1792), American officer of the American Revolutionary War

See also
Tom Clark (disambiguation)
Thomas Clarke (disambiguation)
Thomas Clerk (disambiguation)
Thomas Clerke (disambiguation)